Unterbach may refer to:

 Düsseldorf-Unterbach, an urban borough of the German city of Düsseldorf
 Unterbach Air Base, a military air base in Switzerland
 Unterbach, Meiringen, a settlement in the Swiss canton of Bern
 Unterbach, St. Martin in Passeier, a hamlet in the Italian province of South Tyrol

Also
 Unterbäch, a municipality in the district of Raron in the canton of Valais in Switzerland.